"Santa Claus Is Definitely Here to Stay" is a Christmas song recorded by James Brown. Released in 1970 as a single, it charted #7 Pop. It also appeared on the album Hey America.

References

Songs about Santa Claus
James Brown songs
American Christmas songs
1970 singles